Carnival of Rust is the second album by the Finnish rock band Poets of the Fall. It was released on 12 April 2006 in Finland, 12 September 2006 in Sweden, October 2006 in Australia, Russia and Ukraine, then on 20 April 2007 in Germany. The album went straight to the top of the Finnish Top 40 album chart and stayed inside the Top 40 for 26 weeks.

The album went straight to the top on Finnish radio channel YleX due to fan votes and was recognized as "Album of the Week" after remaining number one for three weeks straight. It was certified gold in Finland three weeks after being released and has sold platinum. On 17 December 2006 it was announced that the album is featured in Helsingin Sanomat's "Best albums of 2006" article.

Track listing

Release history

Singles

Awards

References

External links 
Collected Music Videos
Carnival of Rust video
Locking up the Sun video
Other
Official MySpace-Poets of the Fall

Poets of the Fall albums
2006 albums